Songsan Station is a station of the U Line in Yonghyeon-dong, Uijeongbu, Gyeonggi-do, South Korea.

External links
  Station information from Uijeongbu Light Rail Transit Co., Ltd

Seoul Metropolitan Subway stations
Metro stations in Uijeongbu
Railway stations opened in 2012